Bartolo Muñoz (born 29 March 1892, date of death unknown) was a Chilean footballer. He played in four matches for the Chile national football team in 1917. He was also part of Chile's squad for the 1917 South American Championship.

References

External links
 

1892 births
Year of death missing
Chilean footballers
Chile international footballers
Place of birth missing
Association football forwards
C.D. Arturo Fernández Vial footballers